Lonja is a river in central Croatia, a left tributary of the Sava.

It flows westward until turning south near Breznički Hum, passing east of Sveti Ivan Zelina, and turning southeast near Sveta Helena. East of Lupoglav, it turns south again, passing through Ivanić-Grad and nearing the river Sava.

It then flows in parallel to the Sava for the rest of its course, and the nature park Lonjsko polje, a protected area, covers the remainder of the Lonja river basin.

The main tributaries of the Lonja are:
 Česma (Čazma) (106 km long), which joins Lonja northeast of Sisak
 Zelina, south of Ivanić-Grad

Maps

References

Rivers of Croatia